Madame Vincent may refer to:

Adélaïde Labille-Guiard (1749–1803), French painter
Henriette Vincent (1786–1834), French botanical painter